William Hulbert Wolseley (16 June 1821 – 9 May 1899) was an Irish Anglican priest: the  Archdeacon of Kilfenora from 1885 until his death.

Wolseley was born in County Sligo and educated at Trinity College Dublin He was ordained deacon in 1847 and priest in 1848. He was the Vicar of Kilrush from 1862; and Prebendary of Inishcaltra in Killaloe Cathedral from 1864.

Notes

Alumni of Trinity College Dublin
Archdeacons of Kilfenora
19th-century Irish Anglican priests
People from County Sligo
1821 births
1899 deaths